General Yuan Shouqian (1904–1992) was a prominent Chinese and Taiwanese politician from Changsha, Hunan. He was awarded "Superior General Second Class" in Taiwan.

He was the eldest son of the Yuan family. His youngest sister, Yuan Shihui, later married Chen Zhike.

Under the recommendation of Tan Yankai, who was also from Hunan, Yuan Shouqian applied for the Whampoa Military Academy and became one of its first graduating class members.

Yuan Shouqian served many important posts for the Central Government of the Republic of China, including Deputy Minister of National Defense (1950), and Minister of Transportation (1954).

He died of cancer in Taipei in 1992.

See also
 Ministry of Transportation and Communications (Republic of China)

References

1904 births
1992 deaths
Taiwanese Ministers of Transportation and Communications
Republic of China politicians from Hunan
Politicians from Changsha
Taiwanese people from Hunan